The Jesus M. Casaus House, at 628 3rd St. in Santa Rosa, New Mexico, was built in 1917.  It was listed on the National Register of Historic Places in 1982.  The listing included three contributing buildings and a contributing structure.

Its National Register nomination asserts:This two story, pitched roof house constitutes a fine example of the Craftsman/Bungalow Style. The attention to detail, from the battered piers supporting the outside porch to the oak molding and stenciled wall patterning on the interior, is evident throughout the structure. Despite the enclosure of the original back porch, the structure currently expresses an integrity of form in its low-lying massing, craftsman-like detailing and consistency between exterior and interior.

The house was built by or for Jesus M. Casaus (b. December 30, 1867), a sheriff of Guadalupe County and a New Mexico state legislator.

Contributing outbuildings are a two-room storage building and a stone garage.  An underground water cistern with a covering structure, and a water pump, also contribute.

References

National Register of Historic Places in Guadalupe County, New Mexico
Houses completed in 1917